Pozzolengo is an Italian municipality (comune) of 3,557 inhabitants in the province of Brescia, in Lombardy.

Geography 
Pozzolengo is located in northern Italy on the hills in the south of Lake Garda. Though in the province of Brescia (Lombardy), it borders two provinces (Mantua and Verona) and another region (Veneto).

Since it finds itself in a wet land and there used to be many wells, legend has it that the name Pozzolengo derives from the word well (pozzo in Italian).

The town has the following hamlets: Ballino, Belvedere, Bosco, Ceresa, Pirenei, Ponte del Cantone, Rondotto.

History 
The town was inhabited starting from Prehistory and saw different peoples.

Around 1000 the castle was built upon mount Fluno and in 1510 the church was built .

In the 19th century the territory of Pozzolengo was the scene of the battles for the Unification of Italy.

Main sights 

 Church of S.Lorenzo Martire
 Castle of Pozzolengo
 Monumental cemetery, built in 1881 by Giovanni Faini
 Mantelli Bog

Cuisine 

 Salame Morenico of Pozzolengo, awarded with the De.CO recognition
 Traditional biscuit of Pozzolengo, baked with using spelt flour
 Saffron of Pozzolengo

References

Cities and towns in Lombardy